UFC 81: Breaking Point was a mixed martial arts (MMA) event held on February 2, 2008, by the Ultimate Fighting Championship (UFC) at the Mandalay Bay Events Center on the Las Vegas Strip.

Background
The main event featured Tim Sylvia and Antônio Rodrigo "Minotauro" Nogueira for the UFC Interim World Heavyweight Championship. UFC Heavyweight champion Randy Couture declined a championship fight with Nogueira, which resulted in the creation of the interim title.

This event also saw the UFC debut of WWE wrestler Brock Lesnar in a bout against former UFC heavyweight champion Frank Mir.

Results

Bonus awards
At the end of this event, $60,000 was awarded to each of the fighters who received one of these three awards.

Fight of the Night: Tim Sylvia vs. Antônio Rodrigo Nogueira
Knockout of the Night: Chris Lytle
Submission of the Night: Frank Mir

See also
 Ultimate Fighting Championship
 List of UFC champions
 List of UFC events
 2008 in UFC

References

External links
 UFC 81 Website
 UFC 81 fight card

Ultimate Fighting Championship events
2008 in mixed martial arts
Mixed martial arts in Las Vegas
2008 in sports in Nevada